Seaton Sluice was a "station" on the wagonway from  at its terminus in the village of Seaton Sluice. The "station" was served intermittently by passenger trains between 1 May 1851 and April 1853 and wagonway, itself, was abandoned in the 1860s.

In the 1910s, the North Eastern Railway attempted create a heavy rail link to Seaton Sluice through the construction of the Collywell Bay Branch Line but its construction was halted following the outbreak of the First World War and was never completed.

References

Disused railway stations in Northumberland
Railway stations in Great Britain opened in 1851
Railway stations in Great Britain closed in 1853
1851 establishments in England
1853 disestablishments in England